Kurmancî may refer to:

 Kurmancî (magazine), a Kurdish linguistic magazine
 Kurmanji (also known as Northern Kurdish), a Kurdish dialect spoken in Turkey, Iran, Iraq and Syria

See also
 Kirmancki or Zaza, a language spoken primarily in Eastern Turkey